is a professional Japanese baseball player. He plays infielder for the Hiroshima Toyo Carp.

External links

 NPB.com

1980 births
Living people
Baseball people from Hiroshima Prefecture
Japanese baseball players
Hiroshima Toyo Carp players
Komazawa University alumni
Nippon Professional Baseball Rookie of the Year Award winners
Nippon Professional Baseball second basemen
Nippon Professional Baseball shortstops
Nippon Professional Baseball third basemen
Japanese baseball coaches
Nippon Professional Baseball coaches